In mathematics, persymmetric matrix may refer to:
 a square matrix which is symmetric with respect to the northeast-to-southwest diagonal; or
 a square matrix such that the values on each line perpendicular to the main diagonal are the same for a given line.
The first definition is the most common in the recent literature. The designation "Hankel matrix" is often used for matrices satisfying the property in the second definition.

Definition 1 

Let A = (aij) be an n × n matrix.  The first definition of persymmetric requires that 
 for all i, j.
For example, 5 × 5 persymmetric matrices are of the form

This can be equivalently expressed as AJ = JAT where J is the exchange matrix.

A symmetric matrix is a matrix whose values are symmetric in the northwest-to-southeast diagonal. If a symmetric matrix is rotated by 90°, it becomes a persymmetric matrix.  Symmetric persymmetric matrices are sometimes called bisymmetric matrices.

Definition 2 

The second definition is due to Thomas Muir. It says that the square matrix A = (aij) is persymmetric if aij depends only on i + j. Persymmetric matrices in this sense, or Hankel matrices as they are often called, are of the form

A persymmetric determinant is the determinant of a persymmetric matrix.

A matrix for which the values on each line parallel to the main diagonal are constant is called a Toeplitz matrix.

See also
Centrosymmetric matrix

References

Determinants
Matrices